The 2016–17 season was the 128th season of competitive football in the Netherlands.

Pre-season

Eredivisie

Standings

Eerste Divisie

Standings

Tweede Divisie

Standings

Derde Divisie

Saturday League

Sunday League

Hoofdklasse

Saturday A League

Saturday B League

Sunday A League

Sunday B League

Eerste Klasse

Eredivisie (women)

Managerial changes

KNVB Cup

Final

National teams

Netherlands national football team

Friendlies

2018 FIFA World Cup qualification

Netherlands women's national football team

Diary of the season

Deaths

Retirements

References

 
Seasons in Dutch football
N
N